Meteor is a 2009 American disaster television miniseries directed by Ernie Barbarash, written by Alex Greenfield and distributed by RHI Entertainment, in association with Alpine Medien Productions, Larry Levinson Productions and Grand Army Entertainment. Shot in the United States, the series stars Marla Sokoloff, Michael Rooker, Billy Campbell, Stacy Keach, Christopher Lloyd, Kenneth Mitchell, Ernie Hudson, Mimi Michaels and Jason Alexander. The story is about the asteroid 114 Kassandra, which is on a collision course with the Earth. Its surrounding meteorites crash into various locations worldwide, including the small town of Taft, California, while the military is having little success eliminating it.

The first part of the series was broadcast on the NBC network July 12, 2009 and the second part aired a week later on July 19, 2009.

Plot
Astronomer Dr. Lehman (Christopher Lloyd), and his assistant, Imogene O'Neill (Marla Sokoloff), race against time to provide vital information to JPL rocket scientist Dr. Chetwyn (Jason Alexander). Dr. Lehman worked for Chetwyn until Chetwyn fired him, and Lehman is the only one who is authorized to prevent the impending destruction. Lehman gets hit by a car and Imogene strives on alone, encountering various murderers and automotive failures. Amidst the chaos, Detective Jack Crowe (Billy Campbell) desperately searches for his psychotic ex-partner Stark (Michael Rooker) before the madman seeks his revenge against Jack by killing Jack's father and daughter. Meanwhile, Jack's father, the police sheriff (Stacy Keach) of the town of Taft, deals with subsiding the panic in his town as the meteor shower continues. Another subplot involves a family struggling for survival in a meteor-struck hospital.

After the United States launches numerous nuclear weapons at the approaching asteroid, Imogene discovers a flaw in Dr. Lehman's algorithm and finds that 114 Kassandra had been split in two by the comet that knocked it out of orbit. The second half of Kassandra is larger than the first, and the military's nuclear arsenal is already nearly depleted from destroying the first half, which was believed to be the whole meteor.

As the meteor draws closer to Earth, the meteor storms surrounding it cause increasing amounts of damage as they occur at an unstoppable pace. Part of the headquarters of the scientists tracking Kassandra is hit, resulting in Dr. Chetwyn's death.

Imogene finds herself as the only one left who can save the world from destruction, but she can no longer contact the government by any traditional means of communication. After being abducted by and escaping from Stark with Jack's help, she finds a radio tower that can be used to reach the remaining scientists at the base, but Stark unexpectedly returns, having survived being shot thanks to a bulletproof vest he had previously stolen, and he cuts the signal to lure Jack out. By the time that Stark is finally shot dead by the Sheriff and Jack, and the signal is restored, Kassandra has entered Earth's atmosphere. The government decides to launch their remaining missiles in combination with the Russians and Chinese and accept the consequences - massive meteor storms that will still cause catastrophic damage. However, Imogene comes up with a new plan at the last minute, one which initially appears to have failed as Kassandra is not destroyed. It quickly becomes clear, however, that Imogene's plan instead deflected Kassandra harmlessly out of the Earth's atmosphere, saving the planet.

Three months later, Imogene joins Jack's family for dinner. Imogene warns Jack that there will be a "next time" in the year 2027 when an asteroid named AN-1999 passes within about 200,000 miles of Earth. If scientists calculations are one degree off or something knocks the asteroid off of its course, it could hit the Earth.

Cast
 Stacy Keach as Police Chief Crowe
 Marla Sokoloff as Imogene O'Neill
 Christopher Lloyd as Dr. Daniel Lehman
 Jimmy "Jax" Pinchak as Michael "Mike" Hapscomb
 Ernie Hudson as General Brasser
 Kenneth Mitchell as Russell "Rusty" Hapscomb
 Mimi Michaels as Jenny Crowe
 Michael Rooker as Calvin Stark
 Erin Cottrell as Dr. Chelsea Hapscomb
 Anne Nahabedian as Claire Payne
 Ariel Gade as M. Keely Payne
 Alex Paez as Lieutenant Finn
 Paola Turbay as Nurse Huxley
 Tiffany Hines as Maya
 Sam Ayers as Captain Finnegan
 Wyatt Smith as Roadside Boy
 Natalie R Ridley as Police Dispatcher
 Billy Campbell as Detective Jack Crowe
 Jason Alexander as Dr. Nathan Chetwyn
 Zachary Bryan as Deputy Kosey
 Camille Chen as Lieutenant Quigley
 Eugene Davis as Whitaker
 Harrison Knight as Buck
 Cindy Ambuehl as Cheryl
 Chancellor Miller as Trent
 Carmen Argenziano as Border Police Murphy

External links
 
 Meteor: Path to Destruction  Movie Clips
 Meteor at NBC
 Meteor Watch movie: Meteor - Part 1 with subtitles
 Meteor  Watch movie: Meteor - Part 2 with subtitles
 Meteor credits - InBaseline
 Meteor at Rhitv

Television series about impact events
2000s American television miniseries
Fiction about meteoroids
Fiction about main-belt asteroids
Disaster television series